There has been a wide variety of traditional Aboriginal cultures and languages in Western Australia.  Eugene Stockton shows that there have been over 360 million Aboriginal inhabitants of Australia, but a total of only 40 million migrant Australians.

Traditional cultures
Broadly it has been found that traditional Aboriginal cultures can be linked to major drainage basins and to the IBRA system of Interim Biogeographic Regionalisation for Australia. Thus the Noongar people, occupying the South Western Coastal Division Number VI, circumcising cultures of the Yamatji people are associated with the Indian Ocean Division Number VII, the Kimberley peoples with the Timor Sea Division Number VIII and the Desert Groups of the Interior are associated with the Western Plateau Division Number VIII.  Within these broad areas of cultural similarity smaller traditional cultures were closely adapted to the requirements of a bioregion, as it was from these sites that Aboriginal people drew their sustenance.  Thus for example, the Binjareb people took their name from Binjar, a Noongar word meaning wetland and made extensive use of these and the surrounding tuart banksia woodlands of the Swan Coastal Plain.  Throughout Western Australia, Aboriginal people were not just passive recipients of the bounty of these natural environments, but actively took a role in the creation and maintenance of these biogeographic regions, through hunting practices, firestick farming, fish trapping and other means that broadly maintained the flora and fauna of their region.

Post-contact cultures
Aboriginal traditional cultures have been greatly impacted since the settlement of Australia by Europeans.  During the late 19th and early 20th century it was assumed that Australian Aborigines were a dying race, and would eventually disappear.  Aboriginal populations in Western Australia did decline until the 1930s, after which time numbers have increased.  Today, all Aboriginal cultures have been impacted by degrees of marginalisation and exclusion from participation in the dominant culture of Australia.This has resulted in higher than average rates of infant mortality, and lower rates of life expectancy, education and employment.

See also
 Aboriginal history of Western Australia

References

Indigenous Australians in Western Australia
Culture of Western Australia